Abdelkader Taleb Omar (ʿAbd āl-Qādar Ṭāleb ʿOmar; born 1952) is a Sahrawi politician who serves as the ambassador of Sahrawi Arab Democratic Republic to Algeria since 17 March 2018. He is a former prime minister.

Career
Omar is a Polisario Front veteran who has lived in exile in the Tindouf province, Algeria since 1975. He has held several ministerial posts in previous governments, served as speaker of the Sahrawi National Council (the parliament in exile) in the 1995-1998 period, and also as Wali (Governor) of the Smara refugee camp, near Tindouf.

He was named to that post of Prime Minister by SADR president Mohamed Abdelaziz, in the framework of the XI General Popular Congress held in Tifariti on 29 October 2003, and re-appointed again to that post in early 2012.

Abdelkader was widely tipped to be the favorite to succeed Mohamed Abdelaziz, to the post of president in 2015, with the Algerian Département du Renseignement et de la Sécurité considered to be preferring him over other candidates. But Abdelkader ruled himself out, paving way for Brahim Ghali, who was serving as the ambassador in Algiers at that time, and was also considered to be close to the Algerian DRS to ascend to that post.

Abdelkader is widely perceived as a liberal, arguing for a return of the United Nations Mission for the Referendum in Western Sahara to Sahrawi territories, as a preclude to the referendum, unlike many other Polisario Front leaders who would prefer an armed resistance against Morocco.

References 

1952 births
Living people
Place of birth missing (living people)
Polisario Front politicians
Prime Ministers of the Sahrawi Arab Democratic Republic
Infrastructure ministers of the Sahrawi Arab Democratic Republic
Interior ministers of the Sahrawi Arab Democratic Republic 
Information ministers of the Sahrawi Arab Democratic Republic
Sahrawi expatriates in Algeria
Sahrawi Sunni Muslims